Andrey Yuryevich Zubkov (born June 29, 1991) is a Russian professional basketball player for the Russian team Zenit Saint Petersburg of the VTB United League. He also represents the senior Russian national team. He is a 2.06 m (6'9") tall power forward.

Early career
Zubkov grew up with the juniors of Lokomotiv-Kuban. He made his debut with Lokomotiv U-23 team during the 2009–10 season, he also played there during the 2010–11 championship season.

Professional career
Zubkov made his debut with the main team during the 2011–12 season. In December 2016, he was named the VTB United League MVP of the Month.

On June 24, 2019, he signed a 3-year contract with the Russian team Zenit Saint Petersburg of the VTB United League.

Russian national team
Zubkov has been a member of the senior Russian national basketball team. He played at the EuroBasket 2015, and at the EuroBasket 2017.

References

External links
 Andrey Zubkov at eurobasket.com
 Andrey Zubkov at euroleague.net
 Andrey Zubkov at fiba.com
 Andrey Zubkov at fibaeurope.com

1991 births
Living people
2019 FIBA Basketball World Cup players
BC Khimki players
BC Zenit Saint Petersburg players
Centers (basketball)
Medalists at the 2013 Summer Universiade
PBC Lokomotiv-Kuban players
Power forwards (basketball)
Russian men's basketball players
Sportspeople from Chelyabinsk
Universiade gold medalists for Russia
Universiade medalists in basketball